Istituto Leonardo da Vinci or Istituto di Istruzione Superiore Leonardo da Vinci (IIS Leonardo da Vinci) may refer to:

Schools in Italy:
 Istituto Leonardo da Vinci Analisi in Florence
 Istituto Statale d'Istruzione Superiore Leonardo da Vinci - Cologno Monzese
 Istituto di Istruzione Superiore Leonardo da Vinci - Fiumicino
 Istituto di Istruzione Superiore “Leonardo da Vinci” - Carate Brianza

Schools outside of Italy:
 Istituto Leonardo da Vinci in Lugano, Switzerland